Cassidy Hubbarth (born September 19, 1984) is an American television anchor. Hubbarth formerly hosts ESPN2's NBA Tonight and also anchors ESPN's SportsCenter and College Football Live.

Early life
Hubbarth was born in the Chicago area to Emmeline and Gerry Hubbarth. Hubbarth is of Filipino descent from her mother Emmeline's side and of German and Irish descent from her father  Gerry's side. Hubbarth is a native of Evanston, Illinois. She graduated from Evanston Township High School in 2003, where she was a three-sport athlete for four years. Hubbarth was a part of the 2002 ETHS State Championship high school soccer team. She attended the University of Illinois for one year before receiving her Bachelor of Science degree from the Medill School of Journalism at Northwestern University.

Career
Prior to working at ESPN, Hubbarth was a host and reporter for the Big Ten Network and Fox Sports South, where she won a Southeast Emmy for Interactivity for her work on SEC Gridiron Live. After graduation, she worked for Navteq as a traffic reporter and producer for WMAQ NBC5 Network in Chicago. She also worked at Intersport as a production assistant, associate producer and host.  Hubbarth joined ESPN in August 2010 as a studio anchor and host for college football, college basketball and the NBA on ESPN3. She also hosted other exclusive ESPN3 broadcasts such as the Georgia Pro Day, the Baylor Pro Day and the Madden Bowl. In March 2013, Hubbarth became a full-time anchor for ESPN, hosting various shows across the ESPN Networks including SportsCenter, NBA Tonight, The NBA Today podcast, Highlight Express, Numbers Never Lie, SportsNation, First Take and others.

Personal life
Cassidy is the youngest of three children. She is also a die-hard Chicago Bulls fan. She gave birth to a girl in December 2018.

References

1984 births
American people of Filipino descent
American people of German descent
American people of Irish descent
American television sports anchors
College football announcers
College basketball announcers in the United States
National Basketball Association broadcasters
Living people
Northwestern University alumni
University of Illinois alumni